Parapsestis wernyaminta is a moth in the family Drepanidae. It was described by Gyula M. László, Gábor Ronkay, László Aladár Ronkay and Thomas Joseph Witt in 2007. It is found in the Chinese provinces of Shaanxi, Henan and Sichuan.

References

Moths described in 2007
Thyatirinae
Moths of Asia